Helmut Anschütz (13 July 1932 – 8 October 2016) was a German fencer. He represented the United Team of Germany at the 1960 Summer Olympics in the team épée event.

References

1932 births
2016 deaths
German male fencers
Olympic fencers of the United Team of Germany
Fencers at the 1960 Summer Olympics
Sportspeople from Dresden
German épée fencers
20th-century German people